Ricardo Kanji (born 1948 in São Paulo) is a Brazilian recorder player and luthier. For twelve years, he was a professor at the Royal Conservatory in the Hague. He is a member of the Orchestra of the 18th Century, and the choir and orchestra Vox Brasiliensis.

Biography 
He began his musical studies with Tatiana Braunwieser, and later studied with Lavinia Viotti, who introduced him to the recorder. At fifteen he began studying flute with João Dias Carrasqueira and two years later joined the Philharmonic Orchestra São Paulo (now defunct) and the Municipal Symphony Orchestra of São Paulo .

In 1966, after a period of study in the United States, he founded the group Musikantiga. In 1969, he began to study flute at the Peabody Institute of Music in Baltimore.

Kanji spent over 25 years in the Netherlands, during which time he specialized in the interpretation of Baroque and Classical music. He studied at the Royal Conservatory of The Hague, where he was a student of Frans Brüggen and Frans Vester, between 1970 and 1972, obtaining his soloist diploma. In 1970 he won the First International Recorder Competition in Bruges, Belgium. He was a professor at the Royal Conservatory from 1973 to 1995. He was also artistic director of the Orchestra Concerto Amsterdam from 1991 to 1996. He participated in the most important orchestras playing on period instruments in the Netherlands and created the Ensemble Philidor. He returned to Brazil in 1995, continuing to work as a performer, conductor, teacher and luthier.

He was artistic director of the project History of Brazilian Music, which produced a series of television programs and CDs on the rich and little known of colonial Brazil. For this work he was awarded as the best 1999 ruling by APCA (Art Critics Association of Sao Paulo).

In November 2006 he conducted Donizetti's Don Pasquale in the Netherlands, Belgium and Poland, with stage direction by Walter Neiva, a production of the Opera Krakowska (Opera Theatre Kraków ). The CD "Neukomm in Brazil," directed by Ricardo Kanji and Rosana Lanzelotte received the Premio Bravo award in 2009 for the best recording of the year.

More recently, Ricardo Kanji has been dedicated to spreading the colonial music of Brazil and the Americas, serving as guest conductor in Brazil and Europe.

See also 
 Sigismund von Neukomm

External links 
 Video: History of Brazilian Music. Documentary presented by Ricardo Kanji Produced by Ricardo Kanji, Ricardo Maranhão, Paulo Castagna and Reinaldo Volpato. São Paulo: Telebras, Cepec 1999.

References

1948 births
Recorder players
Brazilian classical musicians
Living people